Hants may refer to:

Hampshire, a county in England, abbreviated Hants in print
 Mid Hants Watercress Railway, in Hampshire
Hants County, Nova Scotia, a Canadian county named for the English one
East Hants, Nova Scotia, a municipal district
West Hants, Nova Scotia, a municipal district
Hantsport, Nova Scotia, the town and port
Electoral districts (ridings) in the county include:
Hants (electoral district)
Hants (provincial electoral district)
Hants East
Hants West
Kings—Hants
Halifax—East Hants
Colchester—Hants
Hant's Harbour, Newfoundland and Labrador, a Canadian town